To hallow is to make holy or sacred, to sanctify or consecrate, or to venerate.

Hallow, or variations, may refer to:

 Hallow, Worcestershire, a place in England
 Hallows (surname), including a list of people with the name
 Hallowes, a surname, including a list of people with the name
 The Hallow, a 2015 horror film
 Hallow (album), a 2017 album by Duke Special
 Hallow (app), a Catholic meditation and prayer app

See also
 
 
 Allhallowtide
 Hallow-e'en (All Hallows' Eve), October 31st
 All Hallows' Day (All Saints' Day), November 1st
 All Hallows (disambiguation)
 All Hallows' Eve (disambiguation)
 Hallowed Be Thy Name (disambiguation)
 Hallowed Ground (disambiguation)
 Deathly Hallows (disambiguation)
 Unhallowed (disambiguation)